Patrick Omolade Hamilton is a Sierra Leone judge and an associate justice in the Supreme Court of Sierra Leone. He had previously served as a judge in the Sierra Leone High Court and the Sierra Leone Court of Appeal. He was appointed as a Supreme Court justice by Sierra Leone's president Ernest Bai Koroma and took office on January 22, 2009, after being confirmed by the Sierra Leone Parliament.

Born and raised in Freetown, Sierra Leone to Creole parents, Omolade Hamilton studied Law in the United Kingdom before returning to Sierra Leone in 1977. He started his law profession in Freetown as a State Counsel; three years later, he was made a Magistrate Judge. He soon rose his rank to a High Court Judge and Appeals Court Judge and as a Supreme Court Judge.

Early life
Patrick Omolade Hamilton was born and raised in Freetown, Sierra Leone's capital city to Creole parents.

Law profession
Patrick Omolade Hamilton studied Law in the United Kingdom before returning to Sierra Leone in 1977. He started his law profession in Freetown as a State Counsel; three years later, he was made a Magistrate Judge. He soon rose his rank to a High Court Judge and Appeals Court Judge and as a Supreme Court Judge.

References

Living people
People from Freetown
20th-century Sierra Leonean judges
Year of birth missing (living people)
Sierra Leone Creole people
21st-century Sierra Leonean judges